Suyuan station, is an interchange station of Line 6 and Line 21 on the Guangzhou Metro. It started operations on 28 December 2016.

The station has 2 underground island platforms, each for the respective lines.

Station layout

Exits
There are 4 exits, lettered A, B, C and D. Exits A and B are accessible. Exit A is located on Shuixi Road, all others are on Kaichuang Avenue.

Gallery

References

Railway stations in China opened in 2016
Guangzhou Metro stations in Huangpu District